Ipsos Reid was the name of a Canada-based research company, still existing under the name Ipsos as the Canadian arm of the global Ipsos Group. Founded in Winnipeg in 1979 as the Angus Reid Group, the company expanded across the country and was purchased by the Ipsos Group and given the name Ipsos Reid in 2000.

Today, Ipsos is Canada's largest market research and public opinion polling firm. The company's researchers conduct both syndicated and customized research studies across key sectors of the Canadian economy, including consumer packaged goods, financial services, automotive, retail, health and technology & telecommunications.

With operations in seven Canadian cities, Ipsos employs more than 600 research professionals and support staff across Canada. The company has the biggest network of telephone call centres in the country, as well as the largest pre-recruited household and online panels. The current President and CEO for Ipsos in Canada is Gary Bennewies.

Memberships
Ipsos is a member of the following associations:
 The Marketing Research and Intelligence Association

References

External links
 Canadian homepage 

Public opinion research companies
Market research companies of Canada
Canadian subsidiaries of foreign companies

Companies based in Winnipeg